The Anglican Diocese of New Bussa is one of 8 within the Anglican Province of Kwara, itself one of 14 provinces within the Church of Nigeria. The current bishop is Israel Amoo.

References

Dioceses of the Province of Kwara
Church of Nigeria dioceses